Leonard Foster Ward (24 March 1866 – 1 September 1945) was an English clergyman and cricketer who played first-class cricket for Derbyshire in 1899.

Life
Ward was born in Middleton, Lancashire, the second son of Rev Charles Bruce Ward  and his wife Hannah Maria Blagg. His father had played first-class cricket for Oxford University. Ward was educated at Denstone College and Selwyn College, Cambridge. He made his cricketing debut in 1887 for Gentlemen of Derbyshire vs. Gentlemen of Canada. He was ordained deacon at St Albans in 1893, and priest in 1894. From 1893 to 1895 he was curate of Wrexham, Denbighshire. He then became curate of Whitfield, Derbyshire.

Ward appeared in one first-class match for Derbyshire during the 1899 season, against Lancashire. He was bowled out for a duck in both of his innings, first by onetime Test cricketer Arthur Mold, and secondly by Test cricketer Albert Ward.

Ward left Whitfield in 1904 and became curate in charge at All Saints Church St. Helier, Jersey. He was vicar there from 1916 to 1945.

Ward died at St Helier at the age of 79.

Family
Ward married Ruby Smith of Glossop, and had a family. His brother Cyril Ward (1863–1935) was a noted water colour painter. His cousins Charles and Herbert were also first-class cricketers.

References

1866 births
1945 deaths
People educated at Denstone College
Alumni of Selwyn College, Cambridge
English cricketers
Derbyshire cricketers
19th-century English Anglican priests
20th-century English Anglican priests
People from Middleton, Greater Manchester